Burak Yeter (born 5 May 1982) is a Turkish-Dutch DJ, record producer and remixer.

Early life 
Burak Yeter By age 8, he picked up playing the guitar. After receiving his undergraduate education in Civil Engineering in Akdeniz University, Yeter settled in London and earned his master's degree in Sound Engineering from SAE Institute.

Musical career 
At the age of 22, Yeter came into recognition by performing at the MTV Dance Floor Chart Party in Malta. The same year, he finished in second place at the Miller Master DJ Competition.

Yeter's debut album, For Action, was released under the record label DSM in 2005. The album is his first solo DJ album to be released worldwide. His second album, For Message Volume 2 released in 2007 was in support of raising awareness of global warming.
Burak Yeter is also the CEO of Connection Records.

In 2013, he released the single "Storm" in Amsterdam. The song reached within the Top 100 spots on the dance charts Internationally. At the same time, he shot a music video for the song "Storm" in the Netherlands.

After ten years, Yeter started a new page in his career with his "New World" project; "new songs with a new world". He released his first single "Happy" on Spinnin' Records, where the track was voted best song of the week in the Spinnin' Talent Pool. Follow-up single "Tuesday" was a bigger success, reaching the #1 slot on a number of charts globally and was the 10th most Shazam'd song worldwide in 2017. The following year, Yeter scored another hit via his "My Life Is Going On," which was a Top 10 hit in Italy, Hungary, and Poland. In 2020, Yeter made DJ Mag's Top 100 DJ list, coming in at #82 in his debut on the list.

Yeter is currently working on upcoming projects in his studio in Amsterdam.

Discography

Studio albums

Singles

Remixes
 2017 Alan Walker – "Sing Me to Sleep" (Burak Yeter Remix)
 2017 Anne-Marie – "Ciao Adios" (Burak Yeter Remix)
 2017 Reyko – "Spinning Over You" (Burak Yeter Remix)
 2017 Filatov & Karas feat. Rada – "Lirika" (Burak Yeter Remix)
 2018 Cecilia Krull "My Life Is Going On" (Burak Yeter Remix)

Awards for music sales

Awards and nominations

References

External links
 Biography

1982 births
Living people
Turkish DJs
Electronic dance music DJs